Salvia dombeyi, the giant Bolivian sage,  is a tender perennial plant found at approximately 3000 m elevation in Peru, and is a popular subject for gardens. In cultivation, and with proper support, this vining sage can climb from 3–6 m. The heart-shaped dark green leaves have a long petiole with short hairs. The flowers are among the largest salvia flowers, typically at least 8 cm long—with a 4 cm currant-red calyx and a 9 cm scarlet corolla.

This semi-evergreen plant has been given an H2 hardiness rating by the Royal Horticultural Society in the UK. It tolerates low temperatures, but not freezing. It prefers a sheltered position in full sun or partial shade.

References

dombeyi
Flora of Peru